Jaroslav Jašek (29 March 1946 – 5 September 2010) was an orienteering competitor who competed for Czechoslovakia. At the 1970 World Orienteering Championships in Eisenach he won a bronze medal in the relay, together with Zdenek Lenhart, Bohuslav Beranek and Svatoslav Galik.

References

1946 births
2010 deaths
Czechoslovak orienteers
Male orienteers
Foot orienteers
World Orienteering Championships medalists